KXXI (93.7 FM, "93X") is a radio station licensed to serve Gallup, New Mexico, United States. The station is owned by Millennium Media, Inc.

KXXI broadcasts a classic rock music format branded as "93X".

As KQNM, the station had a Top 40 format branded “KQ93” through the early 1990s.

In March 1994, the Gallup Broadcasting Company reached an agreement to sell this station to KKOR/KYVA, Inc.  The deal was approved by the FCC on June 7, 1994, and the transaction was consummated on the same day.  The company later changed its name to Millennium Media, Inc.

The station was assigned the KXXI call sign by the Federal Communications Commission on November 25, 1996.

References

External links
KXXI official MySpace page
Millennium Media, Inc.

XXI
McKinley County, New Mexico
Classic rock radio stations in the United States